Sans Prendre is French and means "without taking [it]". It may refer to:

 Sans Prendre or Sansprendre, an alternative name for German Tarok, a south German card game
 Sans Prendre, an alternative name for Tapp (card game), a card game from the Württemberg area of Germany
 Sans Prendre, an alternative name for the Bohemian card game of Bavorsky taroky or Tapp
 Sans prendre. an announcement in the historical card game of Ombre